Pundi or Pundi Gatti, usually a round shaped soft rice dumpling belonging to Mangalorean cuisine, native to Tulu Nadu region of India, prepared by soaking, grinding, tempering, cooking and finally steaming the rice. Pundi Gatti is popularly known as Pundi in Udupi and Mangalore cities of Karnataka state. Like most of the Mangalorean breakfast recipes it is usually served with coconut chutney.

It's also made with jaggery and grated coconut filling, known as Cheepe Pundi in Tulu

See also
 List of dumplings

References 

Mangalorean cuisine
Steamed foods
Indian rice dishes
Karnataka cuisine